A referendum on the Nouméa Accord was held in New Caledonia on 8 November 1998. It was approved by 71.85% of voters. The proportion of voters in favour was highest in the Loyalty Islands (where turnout was lowest) and lowest in the South Province (where turnout was highest).

Background
After the rejection of independence in the 1987 referendum and the subsequent Ouvéa cave hostage taking in April and May 1988, the Matignon Agreements signed in June 1988 (and approved in a France-wide referendum) provided for another referendum in the territory in 1998. The Nouméa Accord was subsequently agreed on 5 May 1998, and provided for a gradual transfer of powers to the New Caledonian authorities.

Results

References

1998 referendums
1998 in New Caledonia
Referendums in New Caledonia
November 1998 events in Oceania
Autonomy referendums